Dakhadayevka is a rural locality (a selo) in Korkmaskalinsky Selsoviet, Kumtorkalinsky District, Republic of Dagestan, Russia. The population was 284 as of 2010. Selo was based in 1901.

Nationalities 
Avars, Dargins and Kumyks live there.

Geography
Dakhadayevka is located 32 km northeast of Korkmaskala (the district's administrative centre) by road. Tukhchar and Gamiyakh are the nearest rural localities.

References 

Rural localities in Kumtorkalinsky District